The Icelandic Figure Skating Championships (Icelandic: Íslandsmót) are the figure skating national championships held annually to crown the national champions of Iceland. Skaters compete in the disciplines of ladies' singles across three different levels; senior ladies, junior ladies, and advanced novice girls (no men since 1996). National Championships in Synchronized skating have been held only once in 2001. Not every event has been held in every year due to a lack of entries. The National Championships are organized by the Icelandic Skating Association. The Icelandic Skating Association is a member of the ISU.

Senior medalists

Ladies

Junior medalists

Ladies

Novice medalists

Boys

Girls

Synchronized skating

Senior medalists

Junior medalists

References

External links
 Icelandic Skating Association
 Skautasamband Íslands
 ISU competition results AgnesDisBRYNJARSDOTTIR
 ISU competition results JuliaGRETARSDOTTIR
 ISU competitions results ThuridurBjorgBJORGVINSDOTTIR
 ISU competition results ValaRunBMAGNUSDOTTIR
 ISU competition results EmiliaRosOMARSDOTTIR

Figure skating national championships
Figure skating in Iceland
Figure Skating